This is a list of Dutch television related events from 2000.

Events
27 February - Linda Wagenmakers is selected to represent Netherlands at the 2000 Eurovision Song Contest with her song "No Goodbyes". She is selected to be the forty-second Dutch Eurovision entry during Nationaal Songfestival held at Ahoy in Rotterdam.
23 April - Bart Schwertmann wins the sixteenth series of Soundmixshow, performing as Ian Gillan.
30 December - Bianca Hagenbeek wins the second series of Big Brother. This was the last series to be broadcast on Veronica.

Debuts

International
/ Saban's Adventures of the Little Mermaid (Fox Kids)

Television shows

1950s
NOS Journaal (1956–present)

1970s
Sesamstraat (1976–present)

1980s
Jeugdjournaal (1981–present)
Soundmixshow (1985-2002)
Het Klokhuis (1988–present)

1990s
Goede tijden, slechte tijden (1990–present)
Goudkust (1996-2001)
Monte Carlo (1998-2002)
Big Brother (1999-2006)
De Club van Sinterklaas (1999-2009)

Ending this year

Births

Deaths

See also
2000 in the Netherlands